The Puerto Rico Soccer League or PRSL is an association football league in Puerto Rico founded in 2008 and the first unified football league in the island's history. Association football had been growing in popularity in recent years, and this was an attempt to further develop the game on the island. The previous highest league in the country was the Campeonato Nacional de Fútbol de Puerto Rico. It shares Division I status with Liga Nacional de Fútbol de Puerto Rico.

History
The league was founded in 2008 starting with 8 teams. The first president of the league was Mike Roca. Over the past few years football has grown throughout the island and is among the top sports in Puerto Rico, behind baseball, basketball, boxing, and volleyball.

Puerto Rico Soccer League participates in League C of the CONCACAF Nations League. In 2009, FIFA donated $150,000 to the Commonwealth of Puerto Rico through the "Win with CONCACAF" program. The donations would most likely go to building more capable stadiums, and other such necessities. The winner of the League got a bid to play in the CFU Club Championship, which serves as the qualifying tournament for the CONCACAF Champions League.

The league was hoping to develop a Second Division to start relegation and promotion by the 2011-2012 season. The federation's president also said they would eventually create a Third Division for amateurs and a Fourth Division for U-17 teams. The Second Division was called Liga Nacional de Futbol de Puerto Rico. In 2009 the Second Division changed from the 2008 season and officially became a league with 16 teams. The league was split into 2 groups of 8 teams. In 2010, the league expanded to 21 teams.

Some of the member clubs are affiliated to larger clubs in more established football leagues around the globe. Some teams in the league received promotions from several international clubs, including Club Atlético River Plate, Club de Fútbol Pachuca, Fluminense Football Club, and Sevilla Fútbol Club. The only team which name did not reflect the promotion was the CF Tornados de Humacao, affiliated to Club de Fútbol Pachuca.

Early years
The league was created on May 14, 2008, and held its first season the same year from June until October with a total of 56 games being played. The inaugural season featured eight teams, and both the regular season and the playoffs were won by the same team Sevilla Fútbol Club Puerto Rico; beating CA River Plate Puerto Rico with a score of 2-1. By winning the championship, Sevilla FC Puerto Rico also qualified to the 2009 CFU Club Championship, joining the seeded Puerto Rico Islanders Football Club. For the 2009 season the league wanted to put in place an "Apertura" and "Clausura" system like the one used in Argentina and Mexico with the Apertura playing from September to December, while the Clausura would play from January to April. However, the league has never implemented the system for a future season.

The expansion team for the 2009 season was Bayamón Football Club when Sevilla FC Bayamón moved from Bayamón to Juncos becoming the Sevilla FC Juncos or Sevilla FC Puerto Rico. The Gigantes de Carolina FC became affiliated with Club Atlético Boca Juniors and became the Boca Juniors Carolina FC.

This season saw the introduction of a home leg and an away leg in the playoffs, with the winner of the aggregate advancing to the final, which also consisted of a two legs format. The first game of the season was played on May 21, 2009 in Juncos, Puerto Rico, between Bayamón FC and defending champions Sevilla FC Puerto Rico, Sevilla won the first match in the new rivalry by winning 1-0. CA River Plate Puerto Rico won the regular season and secured the top seed for the playoffs. The champions of the playoffs was Bayamón FC, winning the aggregate with a score of 3-2 over Atlético de San Juan Football Club. Both, the regular season champion, CA River Plate Puerto Rico, and the playoffs champion, Bayamón FC, qualified for the 2010 CFU Club Championship, joining the seeded Puerto Rico Islanders FC.

Two recess years 2010-2012
There were plans to celebrate the 2010-2011 season with the Apertura and Clausura schedule system. However, due to economic problems and other factors, the league recessed in 2010. Only to schedule a small tournament called "Supercopa DirecTV 2010" which would serve as the qualifier for the CFU Club Championship. Eight teams participated in the tournament, including three new expansion teams (Mayagüez Football Club, Fajardo Football Club and Puerto Rico United Sporting Club) and incorporating the Puerto Rico Islanders FC to the PRSL for the first time. The two finalists of the tournament, CA River Plate Puerto Rico and Puerto Rico Islanders FC, qualified for the 2011 CFU Club Championship.

The 2011 season ran from April to July with only six teams, three of which (Sevilla FC Puerto Rico, CA River Plate Puerto Rico and Puerto Rico United SC) participated briefly in the USL Pro Division. This season saw the move of the CA River Plate Puerto Rico, from Ponce to Fajardo, thus losing the unofficial CA River Plate Ponce designation for the equivalent CA River Plate Fajardo . However, waiting for its stadium to be built in Fajardo, the team played in Carolina.

The regular season was won by the Sevilla FC Puerto Rico, which became the first team to win two regular season cups. Yet, it was defeated in the Playoff Championship game by the season's expansion team Football Club Leones de Ponce. Both teams qualified to the 2012 CFU Club Championship.

The league notified FIFA and the Puerto Rican Football Federation again of a temporary recess for reorganization and was replaced by the Liga Nacional de Fútbol de Puerto Rico, as the highest active league in the country for the 2013 season.

2013-present
On June 4, 2013, the PRSL notified the completion of its reorganization with teams representing the major cities of Puerto Rico and with the involvement of major personalities of the island's sports. It had announced a new "Super Copa" event for the end of 2013 year, and the commencement of a league tournament in April 2014.

In 2015 the league grew to 11 teams, with teams coming from the Liga Nacional.

In 2016, the league played its Apertura tournament with a record 14 teams, with 3 team leaving the league before the start of the Clausura in August 2016.

2017 season
On January 31, 2017; At the headquarters of the Recreation and Sports Department, negotiations took place between Puerto Rico's top clubs and the Puerto Rican Football Federation (FPF) to outline the future of men's top football.
On February 22, 2017; The Puerto Rico Soccer League (PRSL) announced they will be celebrating their 3rd Cup of Excellence with 8 teams known to participate. The Cup of Excellence will begin from 28–30 April 2017 and end around June playing a single lap, carnival style, to save costs to teams.
Clubs (7/8) : Caguas Sporting FC, Ballista FC, Mayagüez FC, Bayamón FC, Club Deportivo Barbosa, and last years champion Metropolitan FA. Also newly created club Global Premier Soccer (GPS) Puerto Rico will be participating as well.
On February 23, 2017; Club Atlético Fajardo was confirmed to be  participating in the Excellence Cup III, becoming the 8th club to participate.
On March 1, 2017; Fraigcomar SC in the San Francisco neighborhood of San Juan returns for the first time since 2007 to a higher category and will be in the Excellence Cup III.
On March 29, 2017; A week before the cup began, PRSL announced that Academia Quintana had been accepted into the Cup of Excellence.

On Sept 4th 2017, the Puerto Rico Soccer League (PRSL) announced it will be holding its next tournament in conjunction with the efforts of the Puerto Rican Federation of Soccer (FPF) Competitions Commission which is scheduled to begin in early October this year. The unification tournament of the Commission of Competitions will be a temporary one for the professional project of first and second division in 2018 according to the new statutes of the FPF.

The Puerto Rico Soccer League (PRSL) and its affiliates held several important meetings last week to re-establish the league's professional tournament in Puerto Rico on September 17 it was announced. It was confirmed the entry of seed capital private investment that will help in the process of re-organization of the league into a professional and inclusive format. The tentative start date of the professional tournament would be September 7, 2018. Currently there are preliminary talks between the PRSL and the FPF on the allocation of the First Official Division and it is expected that in the coming weeks the PRSL will make an official presentation to the FPF detailing their plans and other particularities in the face of the beginning of their professional tournament in the 2018.

Current Teams and staff
2016 PRSL Season

Executive Staff

League Commissioner: María Larracuente 

Director of Operations:  Jose Luis Pacheco

Past league presidents
 Mike Roca (2008-2010)
 Joey Serralta (2011-2013)
 Esteban Rodriguez Estrella (2013-2014)
 Joey Serralta (2016–present)

League Champions and Records

1The league recessed in 2010. Established a tournament called "Supercopa DirecTV 2010" which served as the qualifier for the 2011 CFU Club Championship.

2The league again recessed in 2012, the league reorganized, and became active for the 2014 season.

3The league did not take place in the 2015 season, but then established the PRSL Excellence Cup for teams to compete in.

All-time top scorers

The league's all-time top goalscorer was Julio César Maya Cruz until the 2016 season when the young 18 year old star Karlos Ferrer Mojica scored 29 goals in his first season with Metropolitan FA and the league. He was eventually named by FutbolBoricua the 2016 Player of the Year.

Former teams 

Most municipalities/cities have held quite a few professional teams in the Puerto Rico Soccer League (PRSL)

1 Its first three seasons (2008–2010), the Club Atlético River Plate Puerto Rico played at the Francisco "Paquito" Montaner Stadium in Ponce. In 2011, the team moved to Fajardo, but played in Carolina while its stadium in Fajardo was being built.
2 During its first season (2008), the Sevilla Fútbol Club Puerto Rico played at the Estadio Juan Ramón Loubriel in Bayamón. In 2009, the team moved to Juncos and played at the Alfredo "Papo" Alejandro Stadium. The team played at the Josué Elevadito González Stadium, while the Sevilla FC Stadium was being built.

Media coverage
Through the inaugural year there was no coverage whatsoever, however after a successful first year the league found themselves being covered on local TV stations WAPA-TV and also on OneLink. The league was also covered by local newspapers such as El Nuevo Dia. Since 2015, the league has had its games broadcast online by FútbolBoricua.net

References

External links 
 Federación Puertorriqueña de Fútbol
 Puerto Rico - List of Champions, RSSSF.com
 Futbol Boricua

 
Professional sports leagues in Puerto Rico